The Director of BBC Children's is the Editorial Head of BBC Children's and Education though the post has had a variety of titles since the department's inception in 1950.

The position is line managed by Charlotte Moore.

References

BBC executives